No Runners is an EP by Californian hardcore punk band, Over My Dead Body. It was released in early 2001 on Indecision Records. In addition to the CD format, it was also released in limited edition vinyl pressings of 110 red, 440 blue, 1500 black, with a further 150 re-released in 2003 to mark a summer tour.

Track listing 
"Over My Dead Body"  	– 1:07  	    	 
"Be There" 	– 1:01 	  	
"Drug Free Adult" 	– 0:24 	  	
"You're X'd" (The Faith)	– 1:06 	  	
"Neanderthal Convention" 	– 3:11 	  	
"No Barriers, No Borders" 	– 2:55 	  	
"God Save the Queen" (Sex Pistols)	– 6:51

Credits
 Daniel Sant – vocals
 Scott Lopian – guitar
 Aaron Cooley – guitar
 Rob Moran – bass
 Tommy Anthony – drums
 Engineered by Jeff Forrest
 Mastered by Paul Miner
 Album Cover by Shaun Stroup

External links
 Indecision Records EP page

2001 EPs
Over My Dead Body (band) albums
Indecision Records EPs